AFI's 100 Years...100 Movies – 10th Anniversary Edition was the 2007 updated version of AFI's 100 Years...100 Movies. The original list was unveiled in 1998.

Criteria
AFI asked jurors to consider the following criteria in their selection process:
 Feature length: Narrative format typically over 60 minutes long.
 American film: English language, with significant creative and/or financial production from the United States. (A number of films on the list were British-made but financed by American studios; these include Lawrence of Arabia, The Bridge on the River Kwai, and A Clockwork Orange.)
 Critical recognition: Formal commendation in print, television, and digital media.
 Major award winner: Recognition from competitive events including awards from peer groups, critics, guilds, and major film festivals.
 Popularity over time: Includes success at the box office, television and cable airings, and DVD/VHS sales and rentals.
 Historical significance: A film's mark on the history of the moving image through visionary narrative devices, technical innovation or other groundbreaking achievements.
 Cultural impact: A film's mark on American society in matters of style and substance.

List

Changes from the original list
The following films from the 1998 list were left off the 2007 list:

 39. Doctor Zhivago (1965)
 44. The Birth of a Nation (1915)
 52. From Here to Eternity (1953)
 53. Amadeus (1984)
 54. All Quiet on the Western Front (1930)
 57. The Third Man (1949)
 58. Fantasia (1940)
 59. Rebel Without a Cause (1955)
 63. Stagecoach (1939)
 64. Close Encounters of the Third Kind (1977)
 67. The Manchurian Candidate (1962)
 68. An American in Paris (1951)
 73. Wuthering Heights (1939)
 75. Dances with Wolves (1990)
 82. Giant (1956)
 84. Fargo (1996)
 86. Mutiny on the Bounty (1935)
 87. Frankenstein (1931)
 89. Patton (1970)
 90. The Jazz Singer (1927)
 91. My Fair Lady (1964)
 92. A Place in the Sun (1951)
 99. Guess Who's Coming to Dinner (1967)

Added were:

 18. The General (1926)
 49. Intolerance (1916)
 50. The Lord of the Rings: The Fellowship of the Ring (2001)
 59. Nashville (1975)
 61. Sullivan's Travels (1941)
 63. Cabaret (1972)
 67. Who's Afraid of Virginia Woolf? (1966)
 71. Saving Private Ryan (1998)
 72. The Shawshank Redemption (1994)
 75. In the Heat of the Night (1967)
 77. All the President's Men (1976)
 81. Spartacus (1960)
 82. Sunrise (1927)
 83. Titanic (1997)
 85. A Night at the Opera (1935)
 87. 12 Angry Men (1957)
 89. The Sixth Sense (1999)
 90. Swing Time (1936)
 91. Sophie's Choice (1982)
 95. The Last Picture Show (1971)
 96. Do the Right Thing (1989)
 97. Blade Runner (1982)
 99. Toy Story (1995)

 Of the 77 films that remained on the list, 36 improved their ranking, 38 saw their ranking decline, and three kept their positions: Citizen Kane, The Godfather Part II, and The Best Years of Our Lives.
 The Searchers had the highest increase in ranking, moving from #96 to #12. The greatest decrease without being dropped was The African Queen, which went from #17 to #65.
 The oldest film to be dropped was D. W. Griffith's The Birth of a Nation (1915), from #44. The oldest film to be added was Griffith's Intolerance (1916) (#49).
 The newest film removed is Fargo (1996), the newest added The Lord of the Rings: The Fellowship of the Ring (2001), which is also the only film on the list released after 1999.
 The highest-ranked addition was The General at #18. The highest-ranked removal was Doctor Zhivago (#39).
 Duck Soup, featuring the Marx Brothers, moved up 25 positions to #60. It was replaced at #85 by another film starring them, A Night at the Opera.
 Seventy-three of the films were nominated for the Academy Award for Best Picture. Twenty-eight won, including Sunrise (1927), which won the Academy Award for Unique and Artistic Production (an award that was only presented at the first ceremony). The original list has 75 Academy Awards Best Picture nominees and 33 winners.
 In the 2007 list, eight of the top ten films were nominated for the Academy Award for Best Picture, with five winning. In the original list, nine out of the top ten were nominees, and six won.
 Two animated films appear on each list. In 1998, Snow White and the Seven Dwarfs ranked at #49, and Fantasia at #58. Snow White moved up to #34 in 2007, while Fantasia was dropped, and Toy Story was added at #99. Three were produced by Walt Disney Productions, while Toy Story was a joint production of Walt Disney Studios and Pixar, making Toy Story the only Pixar film on either list.

Most films by director

5
 Steven Spielberg. Spielberg also had five films on the original list, but not the same five. Close Encounters of the Third Kind was dropped and Saving Private Ryan added.

4
 Alfred Hitchcock
 Stanley Kubrick
 Billy Wilder

3
 Frank Capra
 Charlie Chaplin
 Francis Ford Coppola
 John Huston
 Martin Scorsese

2
 Robert Altman
 Michael Curtiz
 Victor Fleming
 John Ford
 Elia Kazan
 David Lean
 George Lucas
 Sidney Lumet
 Mike Nichols
 Alan J. Pakula
 George Stevens
 Robert Wise
 William Wyler

Broadcast
This installment of the American Film Institute's (AFI) Emmy Award-winning AFI 100 Years... series counted down the movies in a three-hour television event airing on June 20, 2007, on CBS. It was hosted by Academy Award-winning actor Morgan Freeman. The program considered classic favorites and newly eligible films released from 1997 to 2005. The special was nominated for two Emmy Awards.

See also
 AFI's 10 Top 10
 List of films considered the best

References

External links 
 AFI website
 AFI 100 Years...100 Movies (1998 edition)
 AFI 100 Years...100 Movies (2007 edition)
 List of the 400 nominated movies (1998 edition)
 List of the 400 nominated movies (2007 edition)

AFI 100 Years... series
Centennial anniversaries